The Allianz Partners Richmond Marathon is an annual marathon foot-race held in Richmond, Virginia, USA. It was established in 1978 and has been run every year since. It was known as the Richmond Newspapers Marathon until 1997 and then as SunTrust Richmond Marathon until 2011. Sports Backers produces the event and serves as the non-profit beneficiary of the event.  The event supports efforts to make running accessible to Richmond area youth through the Kids Run RVA program.

The Anthem Richmond Marathon celebrated its 40th anniversary in 2017.

The marathon commences at 6th & Broad Streets and concludes at 5th and Tredegar streets on Richmond's historic riverfront. Beginning downtown, moving through the VCU campus down to Monument Avenue and through the historic fan district, the race then takes you down to Riverside Drive where you are parallel to the waterfront. Continuing on up through Forest Hill, the race then weaves back through VCU and the fan to bring you around the Sports backers stadium, up past Sugar Shack Donuts with two miles to finish at Browns Island. A party on the riverfront highlights the finish festival area.  Runners have seven hours in which to complete the marathon.

History

The inaugural marathon in 1978 saw 1,183 take part in the main event with an additional 900 in the 8 km run and 639 in the half marathon. David Ruggles was the first winner of the marathon with a time of 2:28:49. Bobbie Allen was the first female winner with a time of 3:15:40.

The marathon suffered a decline in participation during the late 1980s and early 1990s, with just 434 taking part in 1992. In 1998 the half marathon was dropped, and participation in the main event tripled. Today the Half Marathon has returned at total participation in the 8k, half marathon and marathon reached 19,700 in 2013.  The Anthem Richmond Marathon is now the 18th largest marathon in the United States.

The current course record is held by Kenya's Kennedy Kemei, who ran 2:13:45 in 2011. The female record is held by Russia's Irina Suvorova who ran 2:31:25 in 2000.

Awards

The Anthem Richmond Marathon was named Top 15 Best Fall Marathons in the U.S. in 2015. Anthem Richmond Marathon was also named one of the top 25 qualifying races for the Boston Marathon. Richmond was also named top race worth traveling for in Virginia in 2014.

Who

This race is open to athletes of all ages. The event also offers accommodations for strollers and wheelchairs. The race has live DJ’s, bands, spirit groups and party zones to pump you and give you that extra motivation.

2011 Event

RICHMOND, VA – With a time of 2:13:45, Kenya’s Kennedy Kemei, 33, set a new course record today in the 2011
SunTrust Richmond Marathon. The previous course record was 2:14:32, set by Andrei Gordeev in 2005. Kemei walked
away with a total of $5,500 in prize money - $2,500 for the first-place finish,
an additional $2,500 for setting a new course record, and a bonus of $500 for
finishing under two hours and twenty minutes. Mekides Bekele, a 25-year-old
Ethiopian, was the first female to cross the finish line, clocking in at 2:47:50.

2016 Event

Twenty-seven year old Dadi Beyene of Ethiopia won the 2016 Anthem Richmond Marathon in a time of 2:19:36. Beyene finished ahead of Peter Limo and former champion and course-record holder Kennedy Kemei, both of Kenya. Thirty-two year old Peter Limo, finished in 2:19:41 and 38-year-old Kemei, finished in 2:20:03. Bizuwork Getahun, a 27-year-old Ethiopian, was the first female to cross the finish line, coming in with a time of 2:37:51. Getahun’s time was the fastest winning time in the marathon since 2002.

References

External links
Richmond Marathon
marathonguide.com - Richmond Marathon
2008 Richmond Marathon - Run The Nation

 x

Recurring sporting events established in 1978
Marathons in the United States
Sports in Richmond, Virginia